Cambodia, Pol Pot, and the United States: The Faustian Pact is a 1991 book by Michael Haas, professor of political science at the University of Hawaii. Published with the end of the Cold War, the book analyzed the United States support for Pol Pot and the Khmer Rouge against Soviet-backed Vietnam.

1991 non-fiction books
American non-fiction books
Books about foreign relations of the United States
Cambodia–United States relations
History books about Cambodia